Arthur Trevor may refer to:

Arthur Trevor (MP) for Hillsborough (Parliament of Ireland constituency)
Arthur Trevor (cricketer)
Arthur Trevor (colonial administrator)

See also
Arthur Hill-Trevor (disambiguation)